Akbar Torki  is an Iranian physician and conservative politician who served as member of the Islamic Consultative Assembly from 2016 to 2020 from the Fereydunshahr, Fereydan, Chadgan, and Buin va Miandasht constituency. He is a sonographer and was the spokesman for the parliamentary health commission during his tenure.

References 

Members of the 10th Islamic Consultative Assembly
Living people
Year of birth missing (living people)